This article details the fixtures and results of the Indonesia national football team in 2008.

Notes
  Match was suspended at the start of second half as Libya team failed to take to the field. Indonesia awarded 3 goals and the title.

2008
2008–09 in Indonesian football
2007–08 in Indonesian football
Indonesia